L'Odeur de la mandarine is a 2015 French drama film directed by Gilles Legrand. It stars Olivier Gourmet and Georgia Scalliet. It was nominated for two César Awards at the 41st César Awards. The mother and her child have to seek shelter under the manor of kind and rich retired general. He and the mother decide to marry but they plan to have no children. The general and the mother having trouble in bed. The general decides to satisfy through prostitution. The mother quite piss about this and decide to hump with the horse keeper who has already kept an eye on her for sometime.

Cast 
 Olivier Gourmet as Charles
 Georgia Scalliet as Angèle
 Dimitri Storoge as Léonard
 Hélène Vincent as Émilie
 Marine Vallée as Louise
 Fred Ulysse as Firmin
 Romain Bouteille as the notary
 Michel Robin as the priest
 Alix Bénézech as Louison
 Urbain Cancelier as Sergeant

Accolades

References

External links 
 

2015 films
2015 drama films
Films set in 1918
2010s French-language films
French drama films
Films directed by Gilles Legrand
2010s French films